Dennis Michael Crosby (July 13, 1934 – May 4, 1991) was an American singer and occasional actor, the son of singer and actor Bing Crosby and his first wife Dixie Lee, and twin brother of Phillip Crosby. He was the father of Star Trek TNG actress Denise Crosby (who was named after him), and of screenwriter/film producer Gregory Crosby (Hacksaw Ridge).

Early life 
Dennis Crosby attended Bellarmine College Preparatory in San Jose with his other brothers where he graduated in 1952 and subsequently enrolled at Washington State University at Pullman on an animal husbandry course with his twin brother. He dropped out of the course after two years and was inducted into the Army in January 1955. He was initially posted to Fort Ord, California and then transferred to Fort Riley in Kansas for training with the US 10th Infantry Division which transferred for duty in West Germany in the summer of 1955.

When he was 21 in 1955, Dennis inherited $200,000 from his late mother's trust.

Career 

In the late 1950s, Dennis and his brothers Gary, Lindsay and Phillip often performed as the Crosby Brothers in nightclubs and on The Ed Sullivan Show, though Dennis reputedly wished to avoid such appearances.

Personal life 

On May 4, 1958, Crosby married Pat Sheehan, a Las Vegas showgirl and model who had once dated his father shortly after his mother had died. She was also Miss San Francisco of 1950, Playmate of the month of October 1958, and a part-time actress. Within days, Crosby was sued by another woman, Marilyn Miller Scott, over the paternity of her daughter, Denise Crosby.  The sensational lawsuit lasted three years and ended with Dennis being ordered to pay Scott child support and legal fees.  This and the marriage to Sheehan and other details caused deep embarrassment for both him and his father.  Although Bing Crosby died when his granddaughter was 19, the two reportedly never met.

Crosby and Sheehan had three sons: Gregory Evan, Dennis Michael Jr., and Patrick Anthony. In 1963, while working in Los Angeles for Bing Crosby Productions, he met Arleen Newman. On July 3, 1964, Crosby and Sheehan were divorced. Later that year, Crosby married Newman. The couple had three daughters, including: Erin Colleen Crosby (born February 25, 1971, in Los Angeles); and Kelly Lee Crosby. Additionally, Crosby adopted Newman's daughter, Catherine Denise Crosby, from her first marriage to Mike Buell, which ended in divorce. Crosby and Newman divorced in 1991.

On December 11, 1989, Crosby's younger brother Lindsay committed suicide by gunshot.

Death 
Deeply distraught by his brother Lindsay's suicide and his own recent divorce, Crosby died from a self-inflicted gunshot wound on May 4, 1991, in Novato, California, aged 56. On January 14, 2006, Crosby's former wife, Pat Sheehan, died at the age of 74. Their son Dennis Michael Crosby Jr. died on January 15, 2010, and Patrick Anthony Crosby (born New Year's Eve 1960), died at Cedars-Sinai Medical Center in Los Angeles, on September 19, 2011, after a lengthy illness.

Family relations 
 Son of Bing Crosby
 Brother of Phillip (twin), Gary and Lindsay Crosby
 Half-brother of Harry Crosby, Nathaniel Crosby and Mary Crosby
 Nephew of the bandleader Bob Crosby
 Cousin of Chris Crosby
 Father of Denise Crosby, Gregory Crosby, father-in-law of Spice Williams-Crosby

Filmography

References

External links 

 

1934 births
Male actors from Los Angeles
American expatriates in Germany
American male film actors
American people of English descent
American people of Irish descent
American male television actors
Burials at Holy Cross Cemetery, Culver City
Suicides by firearm in California
American twins
Washington State University alumni
20th-century American male actors
20th-century American singers
Bing Crosby
1991 suicides
United States Army soldiers
20th-century American male singers